Peremyshliany is a town in Lviv Raion, Lviv Oblast (region) of Ukraine. It hosts the administration of Peremyshliany urban hromada, one of the hromadas of Ukraine. Population: .

Przemyślany, as the town is called in Polish, was first mentioned as a village in 1437. Until the Partitions of Poland (1772), it was part of Poland's Ruthenian Voivodeship. In 1623, Przemyslany received Magdeburg rights. In 1772 - 1918, it belonged to Austrian Galicia, and in 1918, it returned to Poland. In the Second Polish Republic, it was the seat of a county in Tarnopol Voivodeship. The town had a Jewish population of 2,934 in 1900 Most of them were murdered in the Holocaust.

Until 18 July 2020, Peremyshliany was the administrative center of Peremyshliany Raion. The raion was abolished in July 2020 as part of the administrative reform of Ukraine, which reduced the number of raions of Lviv Oblast to seven. The area of Peremyshliany Raion was merged into Lviv Raion.

Famous natives
 Naftule Brandwein, klezmer musician
  (1831–1898), Polish philosopher, rector of the Lwow University
 bl. Omelian Kovch (1884–1944), Ukrainian priest and martyr murdered at the Majdanek death camp.
 Wilhelm Reich (1897–1957), psychoanalyst and natural scientist was born in the village of Dobrzanica (now Dobryanichi), in the Peremyshliany district
 Adam Daniel Rotfeld (born 1938), Polish diplomat and Foreign Minister
 Baruch Steinberg (1897-1940), Rabbi killed in Katyn Massacre
Vilunya Diskin (b. 1942), Holocaust survivor, founding member and author of Our Bodies, Ourselves

Gallery

References

External links 
 Peremyshlyany town website
 Photos of Peremyshlyany
 

Cities in Lviv Oblast
Tarnopol Voivodeship
Historic Jewish communities in Ukraine
Cities of district significance in Ukraine
Jewish communities destroyed in the Holocaust